The 1959–60 European Cup was the fifth season of the European Cup, Europe's premier club football tournament. The competition was won by Real Madrid, who beat Eintracht Frankfurt 7–3 in the final at Hampden Park, Glasgow. It remains the record score for the European Cup final. It was Real Madrid's fifth consecutive European Cup title. It was also the first time that a German team, Eintracht Frankfurt, reached the final.

The tournament saw the first participation by a Greek club, having withdrawn from the previous season.

Bracket

Preliminary round
The draw for the preliminary round took place in Cernobbio, Como, Italy, on 6 July 1959. As title holders, Real Madrid received a bye, and the remaining 26 teams were grouped geographically into two pots. The first two teams drawn in each pot also received byes, while the remaining clubs would play the preliminary round in September.

The calendar was decided by the involved teams, with all matches to be played by 30 September.

|}

1 Kuopion Palloseura withdrew after the draw, Eintracht Frankfurt walkover.

First leg

Second leg

Wiener Sportclub won 2–1 on aggregate.

Nice won 4–3 on aggregate.

Barcelona won 8–4 on aggregate.

IFK Göteborg won 7–3 on aggregate.

Jeunesse Esch won 6–2 on aggregate.

Milan won 5–3 on aggregate.

Fenerbahçe won 4–3 on aggregate.

Rangers won 7–2 on aggregate.

Cervena Hviezda Bratislava won 4–1 on aggregate.

Wolverhampton Wanderers won 3–2 on aggregate.

First round

|}

First leg

Second leg

Real Madrid won 12–2 on aggregate.

Wiener Sportclub won 5–2 on aggregate.

4–4 on aggregate.

Play-off

Sparta Rotterdam won the play-off 3–1.

Rangers won 5–4 on aggregate.

Wolverhampton Wanderers won 4–1 on aggregate.

Barcelona won 7–1 on aggregate.

Eintracht Frankfurt won 5–2 on aggregate.

3–3 on aggregate.

Play-off

Nice won the play-off 5–1.

Quarter-finals

|}

First leg

Second leg

Real Madrid won 6–3 on aggregate.

Barcelona won 9–2 on aggregate.

Eintracht Frankfurt won 3–2 on aggregate.

3–3 on aggregate.

Play-off

Rangers won the play-off 3–2.

Semi-finals

|}

First leg

Second leg

Final

Top scorers
The top scorers from the 1959–60 European Cup (including preliminary round) are as follows:

References

External links
1959–60 All matches – season at UEFA website
European Cup results at Rec.Sport.Soccer Statistics Foundation
 Top scorers 1959–60 European Cup (excluding preliminary round) according to protocols UEFA 
 – results and line-ups (archive)

1959–60 in European football
European Champion Clubs' Cup seasons